Tupile is a town in Guna Yala, Panama.

Populated places in Guna Yala
Road-inaccessible communities of Panama